Chan Meng Kam (born 9 November 1962 in Ludongcun, Dongshi, Jinjiang, Fujian, China) is a member of the Legislative Assembly of Macau. Chan Meng Kam is a member of the Chinese People's Political Consultative Conference, President of the Macau Paralympic Committee, Chairman of City University of Macau and Huaqiao University.

Personal life
Chan arrived in Macau from mainland China when he was 17 years old.
Despite the lack of education, he establishes himself as one of the predominant figure in Macau society. Chan made his fortunes during Macau's economic growth in the early 1990, first as a factory worker.

In 1990, Chan set up Golden Dragon Group Company Limited  and later become the shareholder of San Miu Supermarket Limited. While he started his conglomerate with a rented casino VIP room from Stanley Ho, Chan's business empire later included supermarket, hotel and the trading of electrical appliances. Currently Chan is one of the richest man in Macau, owning hundreds of residential and commercial properties.

Chan transformed the Macao Fujian Fellow General Association from a provincial society to one of the major political parties with a vast network of community services for the working class. With a sizable following among the Fujian new immigrants, Chan entered politics and served as a directly elected legislator between 2005 and 2017.

Trivia
Chan once gave away over one million hk dollars after scoring hole-in-one.

In August 2014, Chan's residence was robbed, a sum of 5000 Macau Pataca was stolen with nobody arrested over the incident.

Election results

See also
 List of members of the Legislative Assembly of Macau

References

1962 births
Living people
Cantonese people
Members of the Legislative Assembly of Macau
Macau United Citizens Association politicians